"Hey Jealousy" is a song by American rock band Gin Blossoms. The song was included on the group's debut album, Dusted (1989), and was re-recorded on their breakthrough 1992 album, New Miserable Experience. It was written by lead guitarist Doug Hopkins, who was fired from the band shortly after the recording of the second album. It became their first top-40 single on the US Billboard Hot 100 in 1993, reaching number 25, and it also peaked at number 20 in Iceland, number 24 in the United Kingdom, number 28 in Australia, and number 39 in Canada.

Background

"Hey Jealousy" was inspired by Hopkins' desire to get back with his ex-girlfriend Cathy Swafford, who had left him because of his drinking and cheating. As one critic notes, the lyrics of the song reflect Hopkins' "constantly self-medicating in the face of depression." However, even though the lyrics' "hopefulness shriveled into empty promise," the performance of the song "is emotionally detached from Hopkins' afflictions" and presents a "sunny soundtrack" for his depression.

Hopkins originally included the line "you can trust me not to drink", but lead singer Robin Wilson insisted on changing "drink" to "think," having grown tired of Hopkins' lyrical references to his drinking problem. Wilson explained:

Hopkins was upset that Wilson changed the lyric, as it was done after he was kicked out of his own band to a song he had penned. Hopkins expressed discomfort with the track when asked about the song after it became a hit, stating, "It's my song, but I don't enjoy it. I mean, when it comes on the radio, I turn it off, because I don't really want to hear that. It doesn't make me feel good or anything." Hopkins destroyed the gold record he had received for "Hey Jealousy" a few weeks before his death in 1993.

Release
Initially largely unnoticed due to its placement on the unsuccessful Dusted, "Hey Jealousy" enjoyed success upon the release of New Miserable Experience. Although the album initially stalled commercially, it received a second promotional push that benefited "Hey Jealousy" in the form of a new music video. Wilson noted,

"Hey Jealousy" was the band's first commercial hit single, reaching number 25 on the Billboard chart in the US. The song has since become one of the band's most enduring hits. Guitarist Jesse Valenzuela joked, "It got everywhere. You can hear it at the Lowe's hardware."

Critical reception
A review by Rolling Stone called the song "manna for radio", highlighting "the ease with which this quintet casts hooks". AllMusic staff writer Rick Anderson stated that "'Hey Jealousy' and 'Until I Fall Away' are the two songs that leave the deepest impression".

Ed Masley of The Arizona Republic listed the song as the Gin Blossoms' best song on his list of the band's top 30 tracks, writing, "It's the obvious choice for a reason -- the signature song that started as the breakthrough hit that made the whole thing possible. And it's a great song, brilliantly arranged so as to maximize the tension and release, its understated verses taking on intensity in a wave of distorted guitars as the song makes its way to that singalong chorus."

Pitchfork said, "Wilson sings, the words rippling out uncannily smooth, their inherent desperation buffed to a shine. The levity in the song's arrangement—the jangling guitar arpeggios, the shivers of tambourine—belie the weight of the addiction and mental illness Hopkins found himself tangled in while writing, which dragged him to his death."

Track listings

US cassette single
A. "Hey Jealousy" – 3:56
B. "29" – 4:18

UK cassette single
A1. "Hey Jealousy" – 3:56
A2. "Keli Richards" – 3:04
B1. "Cold River Dick" – 1:14
B2. "Kristene Irene" – 2:40

European and Australasian CD single
 "Hey Jealousy" – 3:56
 "Allison Road" – 3:18
 "Just South of Nowhere" – 3:26

Australian cassette single
A. "Hey Jealousy"
B. "Just South of Nowhere"

UK 7-inch single
A1. "Hey Jealousy" – 3:56
A2. "Cold River Dick" – 1:14
B1. "Kristene Irene" – 2:40
B2. "Keli Richards" – 3:04

UK CD single
 "Hey Jealousy" – 3:56
 "Cajun Song" – 2:56
 "Just South of Nowhere" – 3:26
 "Angels Tonight" – 3:34

UK maxi-CD single
 "Hey Jealousy" – 3:56
 "Allison Road" – 3:18
 "Just South of Nowhere" – 3:26
 "Angels Tonight" – 3:34

Charts

Weekly charts

Year-end charts

Release history

References

1989 songs
1993 singles
A&M Records singles
Fontana Records singles
Gin Blossoms songs
Songs written by Doug Hopkins
Songs about jealousy
Torch songs
Heartland rock songs